Seymore is both a surname and given name. Notable people with the name include:

 Andre Seymore (born 1975), South African cricketer
 Seymore Butts (born 1964), American pornographic film director and producer
 Will Seymore (born 1992), American soccer player

See also
 Seemore (disambiguation)
 Seymour (disambiguation)